Claudio Matthías Villanueva Gutiérrez (born 16 February 1993), known as Matthías Villanueva, is a Chilean former footballer who played as an attacking midfielder.

He began his football career at Colo-Colo youth ranks during a young age, being promoted to the first adult team by the coach Américo Gallego for a 2011 Copa Chile match against Universidad Católica. Villanueva made his first Primera División appearance the same season for the Clausura Tournament in a 2–0 away defeat against O'Higgins, that occasion, with Ivo Basay as coach. The next season, Villanueva was relegated to the reserve team Colo-Colo B that play at the Segunda División Profesional.

External links
 Matthías Villanueva at Football–Lineups
 

1993 births
Living people
Footballers from Santiago
Chilean footballers
Colo-Colo footballers
Colo-Colo B footballers
Deportes Linares footballers
Chilean Primera División players
Segunda División Profesional de Chile players
Association football midfielders